Vlad Miriță or Vlad (born 2 August 1981 in Târgoviște) is a Romanian pop and opera singer. He represented Romania in the Eurovision Song Contest 2008.

At age 16, Vlad began formal training in music. Throughout his education, he worked with the Armonia Valahă Choir and performed at various national and international events. After receiving private lessons from the famed Maestro Corneliu Fănățeanu in 2001, he joined an Eastern European chamber choir called Madrigal. Vlad went on to win several contests, including Mamaia, the National Pop Festival, in 2002 and was a runner-up in the 2005 International Tenor Voices festival "Traian Grozăvescu", which was held in Lugoj. In 2007 and 2008, Vlad was honored as a scholarship holder of the Opera House Bucharest. 

On 20 May 2008 Vlad performed the duet "Pe-o margine de lume" with Nico, another Romanian singer, as that country's entry in the final for the Eurovision Song Contest.

In 2015 the singer was chosen by Walt Disney Pictures to provide the Romanian voice of Hugo in the animated movie The Hunchback of Notre Dame.

References

External links 

 
 Vlad and Nico's Eurovision Profile

1981 births
Living people
Eurovision Song Contest entrants of 2008
Opera crossover singers
Eurovision Song Contest entrants for Romania
Romanian male pop singers
21st-century Romanian male singers
21st-century Romanian singers